Centralia is an unincorporated community in Braxton County, West Virginia, United States. It was so named because it is in the central part of a county which also happens to be at the geographic center of the state. Its ZIP code is 26601.

Notes

Unincorporated communities in West Virginia
Unincorporated communities in Braxton County, West Virginia